Ambulance Australia is an Australian factual television program on Network 10 that follows the New South Wales and Queensland Ambulance Services, from the Triple Zero Control Centres to paramedics on the road. It is based on the original UK factual series Ambulance.

The show premiered on October 16, 2018, and followed NSW Ambulance call-takers, dispatchers and paramedics as they faced high pressure situations on a daily basis. They are the first to respond to urgent and emergency calls, using their training and experience to make split second decisions that can mean the difference between life and death as they step into situations that can be emotionally fraught or physically dangerous. Filming for Season 1 occurred in mostly metropolitan areas of Sydney.

The show was renewed for a second season, which premiered on Tuesday 26 February 2019. This series focused on the summer period from December 2018 to February 2019. A special three-episode season called Ambulance Australia: Ultimate Emergencies premiered on Sunday 8 September 2019, with some of the worst emergencies of the first and second seasons.

A third season was renewed on 22 September 2019, filming with the Queensland Ambulance Service, to showcase the "Sunshine State's" paramedics and their crucial work, in the state with the highest number of responses to medical incidents every year. It premiered on 6 February 2020. A fourth season was commissioned in October 2020 and premiered on 9 February 2022.

Episodes

Series overview

Season 1 (2018)

Season 2 (2019)

Season 3 (2020)

Season 4 (2022)

Specials

International distribution
In 2019, Season 1 of the series is aired on TVNZ 2 in New Zealand and TVNZ On Demand, the same week as Australia airing the week after the corresponding episode in season 2. On 13 February 2020, New Zealand began airing the second season of the show. Seasons 1 and 2 of the series are available for streaming through Amazon Prime and on BBC iPlayer in the United Kingdom.

References

External links
 
 Endemol Shine Australia
 
 
 

2018 Australian television series debuts
2010s Australian medical television series
2020s Australian medical television series
Australian factual television series
Australian workplace television series
Network 10 original programming
Television shows set in New South Wales
Television shows set in Queensland
Television series by Endemol
Australian television series based on British television series